Taungoo (Tauñngu myoú; ; also spelled Toungoo) is a district-level city in the Bago Region of Myanmar, 220 km from Yangon, towards the north-eastern end of the division, with mountain ranges to the east and west. The main industry is in forestry products, with teak and other hardwoods extracted from the mountains. The city is known for its areca palms, to the extent that a Burmese proverb for unexpected good fortune is equated to a "betel lover winning a trip to Taungoo".

The city is famous in Burmese history for the Toungoo dynasty which ruled the country for over 200 years between the 16th and 18th centuries. Taungoo was the capital of Burma in 1510–1539 and 1551–1552.

Kaytumadi new city (new city of Taungoo) is the central command of the southern command division region of Armed Forces (Tatmadaw). Hanthawaddy United Football Club is based in Taungoo.

Names 
The classical Pali name of Taungoo is Ketumadi (ကေတုမဒီ;), which translates to "possessed of the royal standard."

History

Taungoo was founded in 1279 in the waning days of Pagan as part of frontier expansion southwards. After the fall of Pagan Empire in 1287, Taungoo came under the rule of Myinsaing Kingdom and later Pinya Kingdom. In 1358, Taungoo successfully revolted and became independent until 1367 when it became a nominal part of the Ava Kingdom. Its rulers retained a large degree of autonomy, playing larger Ava and Hanthawaddy kingdoms against each other. In 1470, Ava put down another rebellion and made Sithu Kyawhtin, the general who defeated the rebellion, governor. Sithu Kyawhtin's grandson Mingyi Nyo became governor of Taungoo in 1485. Under Mingyi Nyo's leadership, the principality grew powerful. In October 1510, Mingyi Nyo formally broke away from Ava and founded the Taungoo Kingdom.

Mingyi Nyo's successors Tabinshwehti and Bayinnaung went on to found the largest empire in the history of south-east Asia. Taungoo's stint as capital was short-lived, however. Tabinshwehti moved the kingdom's capital to Pegu (Bago) in 1539. The city briefly again became capital of a rebellion in 1599 when viceroy Minye Thihathu II of Taungoo declared himself king. In December 1599, Taungoo's forces in collaboration with the Arakanese armies aided by Portuguese mercenaries, sacked Pegu. The rebellious city state remained independent for another 10 years when Natshinnaung ascended the Taungoo throne in 1609. In the following year, King Anaukpetlun captured Taungoo and ended the city's long line of rulers. Although few visible historic remains survive, all four sides of the brick city wall remain from the dynastic period, with the exception of the part of the southern wall. The 9.6 m wide moat has largely dried up, except for a section on the eastern side, which is still maintained.

By the mid-19th century, Taungoo was governed by a local governor appointed by the Konbaung kings. The Taungoo District consisted of 52 wards, including today's Pyinmana (and Naypyidaw) regions. The district was cut in half after the Second Anglo-Burmese War. The British annexed the southern half, including the city of Taungoo while the northern portion, including Pyinmana and Ela, remained under Burmese control. British troops were withdrawn in 1893.

In 1940, the British Royal Air Force built an airfield north of the town, which from August 1941 through February 1942 served as a training and support base for the 1st American Volunteer Group, popularly known as the Flying Tigers.

In the Battle of the Yunnan-Burma Road in 1942, the Imperial Japanese Army attacked the Chinese Expeditionary Force in Burma in what is known as the Battle of Toungoo. 

Taungoo celebrated its 500th birthday on 16 October 2010, by reconstructing and renovating many city attractions.

Geography
Three mountain ranges traverse the district—the Pegu Yomas, the Karen Hills, and the Nat Ma Taung or "Great Watershed"—all of which have a north and south direction, and are covered for the most part with dense forest. The rest of Taungoo forms the upper portion of the valley of the Sittaung River.

Climate

Taungoo has a tropical savanna climate (Köppen climate classification Aw) bordering on a tropical monsoon climate (Köppen climate classification Am). Temperatures are hot throughout the year, and the months before the monsoon (March–May) are especially hot with average maximum temperatures exceeding . There is a winter dry season (November–March) and a summer wet season (April–October).

Administration
Taungoo District (The district combined have a total of 6 townships. They are Taungoo, Phyu, Yedashe, Tantabin, Kyaukkyi, Oktwin)
Taungoo Township 
Taungoo Ward – 23 Wards
Taungoo Municipal
District and Township Immigration Dept
Myanmar Timber Enterprise
Finance and Tax Dept
Civil Engineering Dept
District and Township Education Dept
Health Dept
District and Township Forestry Dept
MPPE
Taungoo Correctional Dept. Taungoo Prison
Taungoo Quarry Camp
Taungoo Post Office
Taungoo TeleCom station
Myanmar Television Sub-station
Myawady Television Sub-station
Union Solidarity and Development Association
Myanmar Maternal Children’s Welfare Association
Myanmar Women Affair Federation
Division 5 Railways Office
Taungoo Township and District Courts
"Maha Myittar" Education Foundation

Emergency
 No.1 Police Station Taungoo
 No.2 Police Station Taungoo
 No.3 Police Station Taungoo
 Taungoo Apala Police Station
 Taungoo District Police Force
 Taungoo Township Police Force
 Division 5 Railways Police Force, Taungoo
 Taungoo Motor Vehicle Police Station
 Taungoo Fire Station Command (1 Support Vehicle)
 Taungoo Township Fire Station No.1 (3 Engines)
 Taungoo Township Fire Station No.2 (2 Engines)
 Myanmar Red Cross Society, Taungoo – Ambulance
 Electrical Department
 Taungoo Weather Station
 Bureau of Special Investigation

Military and Internal Security
 Southern Command – Kaytumadi new city
 Taungoo Air Force Base 
 No.47 Helicopters Squadron 
 Amoury Division – Oak Twin
 Artillery Division – Oak Twin
 Police Battalion, Taungoo – Training School
 No.(3) Field Medical Battalion
 Bureau of Special Investigation Training School
 Taungoo Prison Department

Attractions
Shwe San Taw Pagoda (Build by King Min Gyi Nyo)
Kaung Hmu Taw Pagoda
Mya See Gone Pagoda
Myat Saw Nyi Naung Pagoda
Kaylazarti Pagoda (Build by King Bayintnaung)
Statue of King Bayintnaung
Statue of King Min Gyi Nyo
Statue of Bogyoke Aung San
Kantawgyi Garden
Royal Kaytumadi Hotel (Design by Old Taungoo)
Taungoo Kyone
Taungoo Gyi old city
Taungoo Nge old city
Dwaryarwadi old city
Danyawadi old city
Phoe Kyar Elephant garden
Pathi Cheek 
Sittaung River
Naw Bu Paw Mountain (Kayin State, over sea level 4,824 ft)
Than Daung Kyi Mountain city

Investigative bodies
Military Intelligence No.3 (MI)
Special Intelligence (Special Branch) SB
Bureau of special investigations (BSI)
Special Police Force
Narcotic

Demographics
The population of Taungoo in the 2014 census was 108,569; in the 1983 census it was 65,851.

The Bamar (Burmans) make up the majority with a significant Kayin (Karen) population on the eastern side of the city. The Chinese, Indians, Shan and Kayah people make up the rest.

The majority of residents are Theravada Buddhists, and minority Baptists and Roman Catholics. Taungoo is home to a number of Karen Christian association headquarters and churches. See list of churches.

Transport

The main transport options to Taungoo is rail and motorways.

Rail
The Taungoo railway station is on the main north line of Myanmar Railways, and the Taungoo Highway bus station is served by domestic bus lines.

Intra-city transport is mainly through a circular railway line which serves around the Taungoo District and bus lines, which serve downtown, and suburban areas: 

Gandawin Express Bus
Yoma Express Bus
Zay Yar Shwe Pyi Express Bus
Say Taman Express Bus
Sein Myittar Express Bus
Shwe Man Thu Express Bus
Taw Win Express Bus (Naypyitaw)
Tabin Shwehtee Express Bus
Mya Yadana Express Bus (Mandalay)
Shwe Lonn Pyan Express Bus (Taungyi)
Pyu Min Thar (Pyay)

Roads
There are two main road bridges: over the Sittaung River and the Kaphaung River.

Air

Taungoo Airport is the area's only airport and is a military-only air base of Myanmar Air Force. MAF's  No.47 Helicopter Squadron is stationed at the airport.

Education

High schools 
Taungoo has eleven high schools: see List of high schools in Taungoo.

Public universities and colleges 
 Taungoo University
 Taungoo Educational College
 University of Computer Studies
 Technological University
 Government Technical Institute

Nursing and midwifery schools 
 Taungoo Nursing Training School
 Taungoo Midwifery Training School

Divinity schools 
 Paku Divinity School
 St. Peter's Bible School (Anglican)

Healthcare
 Taungoo General Hospital
 Taungoo Railways Hospital
 Taungoo Traditional Hospital
 Defence Services General Hospital
 Thaw Thee Kho Hospital
 Kaytu Hospital
 Royal Hospital
 Myat Thitsar Hospital

Major sites

 Thargaya Elephant Camp
 Kandawggyi Garden
 Kaytumaddy Garden
 Kaphaung Creek Bridge
 Sittaung Bridge
 Electronic Library
 Taungoo Gym
 Taungoo Stadium
 Kha Baung Hall
 Taungoo Municipal Market
 Taungoo Market
 Bayinnaung Market
 Kayinmazay Market
 New 3D Cinema
 Statue of Min Gyi Nyo
 Statue of Ba Yint Naung
 Statue of Bogoke Aung San
 Icon Shopping Center - Taungoo
 Mingalar Cinemas Icon - Taungoo

Pagodas
 Shwesandaw Pagoda
 Myasigon Pagoda
 Kaung Mhu Daw Pagoda
 Myat-Saw Nyi Naung Pagoda
 Ma Har Mu Ni Kay La Zar Ti Pagoda
 Nann Taw Oo Pagoda
 See Gone Gyi Pagoda (Old Taungoo)
 Mya Lane Da Pagoda (Old Taungoo)

Notable residents
Dr. Saw Durmay (Po Min), president of Loyal Karen Association of Burma-India, owner of white elephant and descendant of Karen chief priest
Ringo aka Maung Maung Lwin, singer, composer, and guitarist
Kyar Pauk aka Han Htue Lwin, singer, composer, music producer, vocalist of Big Bag band and guitarist
Naw Li Zar, singer and composer
Saw Say Wah, chairman of Eastern Bago Division Anti-Drug Association and retired chief of police (deputy-director)
Soe Pyae Thazin, actress

Media
MTV or MTV1 – broadcasts in Burmese language.
MTV2 – broadcast in Burmese language and some local languages
MTV4 – 24-hour sport channel. (pay TV)
MTV3 – broadcasts in Thai, Khmer, Vietnamese and English. (pay TV)
MRTV – broadcasts in Burmese, Arakanese, Shan, Karen, Kachin, Kayah, Chin, Mon and English
MWD 1,2 
MRTV3 
The Mirror (Burmese: ကြေးမုံ)(Burmese: ေၾကးမံု-Kyehmonn) – state-run daily (newspaper)
The Voice (newspaper)
Eleven (newspaper)
7Days (newspaper)
The New Light of Myanmar (Burmese: Myanma A-lin) – English and Burmese language (newspaper)
The Myanmar Times (Burmese: Myanma Taing) – private-run English-language weekly (newspaper)
Myanmar Radio National Service (Radio)
VOA (Radio)
BBC (Radio)
Myanmar Teleport (ISP)
Information Technology Central Services (ITCS)-(ISP)
Myanmar Post and Telecommunication (MPT)- (ISP)
Mandalay FM
Shwe FM
Channel 7 – Digital broadcasting free-to-air channel
MRTV 4 – Digital and analogue free-to-air channel

Gallery

References

External links

 

Populated places in Bago Region
Populated places established in 1510
Township capitals of Myanmar
1510 establishments in Asia